Lakshan Rodrigo (born 19 May 1987) is a Sri Lankan cricketer. He made his Twenty20 debut for Lankan Cricket Club in the 2017–18 SLC Twenty20 Tournament on 24 February 2018.

References

External links
 

1987 births
Living people
Sri Lankan cricketers
Lankan Cricket Club cricketers
Sri Lanka Police Sports Club cricketers
People from Panadura